Grassendorf is a commune in the Bas-Rhin department in Grand Est in north-eastern France.

History
Following the Thirty Years War which badly depleted population levels in much of Alsace, a large number of immigrants arrived from the Thiérache region of Picardy during the middle of the seventeenth century.

In the local language the inhabitants of Grassendorf are known as "Welschguller" which means something along the lines of "foreign turkeys".   Until the 1990s the spire of the parish church was topped off by the carving of a turkey rather than of the Gallic rooster which is more normally found on the tops of church spires in rural France.

See also
 Communes of the Bas-Rhin department

References

Communes of Bas-Rhin
Bas-Rhin communes articles needing translation from French Wikipedia